Michael Struck (born in 1952) is a German musicologist, music critic and pianist.

Together with Reinhard Kapp Struck won the 2009 Robert Schumann Prize of the City of Zwickau for his 1984 thesis on Schumann's late work.

References

External links 
 
 
 
 

1952 births
Living people
Musicians from Hanover
20th-century German musicologists
21st-century German musicologists